Congregation Or Zarua is a Conservative synagogue on the Upper East Side of Manhattan, New York City. Founded in 1989 by under two dozen congregants and Rabbi Harlan J. Wechsler, it completed construction of its current building in 2002. Led by rabbi Scott N. Bolton, its membership is approximately 325 families.

History
Or Zarua—whose name, taken from Psalm 97:11, means “Light is sown” (“Light is sown for the righteous and joy for the upright of heart.”)—was founded in 1989 by under two dozen congregants, led by rabbi Harlan J. Wechsler. It conducted its first service on January 28, 1989 at the 92nd Street Y in Manhattan. Services were held monthly until after that year’s High Holidays. The synagogue office and Talmud class were housed at 1384 Lexington Avenue, across the street from the 92 Street Y.

In 1993, having outgrown its borrowed space, the congregation purchased the former Waldensian Church at 127 East 82 Street and refurbished it as a synagogue. The first service was conducted there in May 1993. The building itself had a rich and interesting history as a house of worship: it was built in the early 1880s as a synagogue by Congregation Kehilath Jeshurun; was sold in 1904 and occupied by a series of synagogues until 1950; then was bought by the Waldensian Evangelical Church. At the time of the sale to Or Zarua, the church was the last remaining Waldensian congregation in New York City. The Waldensians—a Protestant sect originating in northern Italy and Switzerland—had been instrumental in saving Jews from the Fascists during the Second World War.

Or Zarua used the refurbished building for five years before beginning construction of its present building on the same site. Its new building, whose sanctuary is featured in Henri Stoltzman’s book Synagogue Architecture In America, was dedicated in Spring 2003.  It offers a daily minyan, weekly Friday night and Shabbat morning services, and holiday services on all Jewish festivals. In addition, it offers a full menu of educational, artistic and musical programs, including art shows in its Social Hall, a weekly Talmud class, lectures by noted figures on subjects of Jewish interest, and an in-house Klezmer band. Membership is approximately 325 families.

Hebrew school
The congregation opened its Hebrew school in 1990 as an afternoon program housed at the Nightingale–Bamford School on East 92nd street. The Hebrew school remained at this location until the congregation opened its own building in 2003. 

The school is open to children (age 5–18) of congregational families, who attend either once or twice during the week from September through May. About two thirds of the congregation’s children attend the congregational school, while the other one third attend Jewish day schools in the area. The curriculum emphasizes the study of Bible, synagogue skills, Jewish culture and values, religious life and laws, Israel and Hebrew language, with the goal of instilling a lifelong connection to Judaism. Or Zarua stresses small classes (on average, 10 students per teacher) as an aid in achieving its goals, since this allows for greater contact between each student and his or her teachers.

Religious leadership
Or Zarua is led by Rabbi Scott N. Bolton, the congregation's second rabbi.
Or Zarua's founding rabbi is Dr. Harlan J. Wechsler.  An alumnus of Harvard College, he was ordained by the Jewish Theological Seminary of America, where he also earned his Ph.D.

Wechsler taught Jewish ethics and the history of Jewish thought in the Department of Philosophy at the Jewish Theological Seminary of America for over thirty years. He is the author of the 1990 book “What’s So Bad About Guilt”.  Wechsler has served as Chairman of the Board of Trustees of The Hospital Chaplaincy, where he is a Life Trustee He also currently hosts a weekly national radio program - "Rabbi Wechsler Teaches" - on Sirius/XM Satellite radio.

References

External links
 Congregation Or Zarua website

Synagogues completed in 2003
Jewish schools in the United States
Jewish organizations established in 1989
Conservative synagogues in New York City
Synagogues in Manhattan